Major John Horace Freeman , PC (19 February 1915 – 20 December 2014) was a British politician, diplomat, broadcaster and British Army officer. He was the Labour Member of Parliament (MP) for Watford from 1945 to 1955.

Early life

Freeman was born in a house in the Regent's Park neighbourhood of London on 19 February 1915, the son of a barrister. The family later moved to Brondesbury. He joined the Labour Party whilst a student at Westminster School in the early 1930s, and later obtained his degree at Brasenose College, Oxford. He worked for a time at the advertising firm Ashley Courtenay.

Career

Military service

During World War II, Freeman saw active service in the Middle East, North Africa, Italy and North West Europe. He enlisted in the Coldstream Guards, was commissioned in the Rifle Brigade in 1940 and served in Britain's 7th Armoured Division (the "Desert Rats").  Bernard Montgomery called him "my best brigade major".  He was appointed MBE in 1943.

Political career

After his return to Britain, he was selected as Labour candidate for Watford and was elected as a Member of Parliament in the 1945 election.

In September 1947, he was appointed Vice-President of the Army Council, the supreme administering body of the British Army.

Originally, Freeman was on the Bevanite left-wing of the Party, although also supported by Hugh Dalton who liked to go 'talent-spotting' among young MPs. He rose quickly through the ministerial ranks, but resigned along with Aneurin Bevan and Harold Wilson in 1951 over National Health Service charges. He stood down as an MP at the 1955 general election.

Journalism and public career

Freeman became a presenter of Panorama and was editor of the New Statesman from 1961 to 1965. He also presented the BBC television interview programme, Face to Face.

In 1962, he described Richard Nixon, then bidding to become Governor of California, as “a man of no principle whatsoever except a willingness to sacrifice everything in the cause of Dick Nixon”. Later in the pages of the New Statesman he portrayed Nixon as "a discredited and outmoded purveyor of the irrational and inactive" whose 1964 defeat would be a "victory for decency." In the event Nixon did not run for President in 1964, but instead supported Barry Goldwater, who lost easily.

While Harold Wilson was Prime Minister, Freeman was appointed the High Commissioner to India (1965–1968). He was appointed to the Privy Council of the United Kingdom in 1966, and then Ambassador to the United States (1969–1971). During his time in Washington he became fast friends with Nixon and Henry Kissinger, and a staunch fan of the Washington Redskins. 

Freeman became Chairman of London Weekend Television Ltd in 1971, serving until his retirement in 1984. During this period, he wrote an article in 1981 which criticised what he saw as the heavy-handed, interventionist broadcasting policy of the British government expressed in the ethos of the Independent Broadcasting Authority and expressed views that would soon come to be closely associated with Margaret Thatcher and the deregulatory, laissez-faire new school of Conservative Party politics. He was director of several other companies in this period and President of ITN (1976–1981).

From 1985 to 1990, he was Visiting Professor of International Relations at the University of California, Davis. Freeman was elected an honorary fellow of Brasenose College, Oxford, in 1968.

Later life

In later life Freeman commentated on bowls for Granada Television.

He retired to Barnes, London, removing himself to a military care home in south London in 2012.

When Morgan Morgan-Giles died on 4 May 2013, Freeman became the oldest surviving former MP. He was the last survivor of those elected to Parliament in 1945. Following the death of Tony Benn on 14 March 2014, he was also the last surviving member of the 1950 parliament and the last surviving MP under King George VI.

Freeman died on 20 December 2014, aged 99, less than two months before his 100th birthday.

References

External links

 
Entry in the Dictionary of Labour Biography
John Freeman: Face to face with an enigma, The New Statesman, 7 March 2013

1915 births
2014 deaths
Military personnel from London
20th-century English businesspeople
Alumni of Brasenose College, Oxford
Ambassadors of the United Kingdom to the United States
British Army personnel of World War II
English broadcasters
English magazine editors
English television executives
English television presenters
Fellows of Brasenose College, Oxford
High Commissioners of the United Kingdom to India
Labour Party (UK) MPs for English constituencies
Members of the Order of the British Empire
Members of the Privy Council of the United Kingdom
Ministers in the Attlee governments, 1945–1951
New Statesman people
Panorama (British TV programme)
People educated at Westminster School, London
Politicians from London
Rifle Brigade officers
UK MPs 1945–1950
UK MPs 1950–1951
UK MPs 1951–1955
University of California, Davis faculty